Polyocha venosa is a species of snout moth. It is found in Greece, Turkey, as well as Israel.

References

Moths described in 1847
Anerastiini
Moths of Europe
Moths of Asia